The Pico do Marumbi State Park is a State park in the state of Paraná, Brazil.

Location

The Pico do Marumbi State Park is in the municipality of Morretes, Paraná.
It may be reached from Curitiba by a 2-hour ride on the centennial Curitiba-Paranaguá railroad, which has a station at the park.
Entrance is free.
The region is very rainy, with driest conditions from April to October.
The park has well-preserved forests.
It is part of the Lagamar Mosaic.

History

The Institute of Lands, Cartography and Forests (ITCF) of the State of Paraná was to administer the park to promote preserving the waters, flora and fauna.
Two years were given for preparation of the management plan, to be integrated with the Marumbi Tourist Area.

The governor said laws were being drafted so the legislature could confirm these measures.
In his first term of office he had created the Guartelá State Park by decree, and the governor who succeeded him had reduced it by 90% through a decree.
This would not have been possible if laws had been passed.
The park remained under the administration of the Environmental Institute of Paraná (IAP).
The decree declared that land within the new boundaries were of public utility, and would be expropriated with compensation.

Mountains

The Marumbi Massif is located inside the state park, a complex with eight peaks with varying degrees of difficulty.
The massif is in the heart of the Serra do Mar of Paraná.
The mountains can be challenging, and it is best to employ an experienced guide.

Other attractions

This gives a view over the Paranaguá and Antonina bays and the Serra do Mar.
The Marumbinistas Waterfall is a  fall on the Taquaral River, which has several natural pools where visitors can bathe.
The park has a free camping area beside the forest police post, with toilets and hot water showers.
There is a museum with pictures, artifacts and maps about the conquest of the peak.

Notes

Sources

State parks of Brazil
Protected areas of Paraná (state)
1990 establishments in Brazil